Societat Civil Catalana ("Catalan Civil Society", SCC by its Catalan acronym) is a Barcelona-based grass-roots organisation that was created in 2014 with the aim of promoting Catalonia’s union to Spain. Most of SCC activities seek to counter the Catalan independence movement. SCC was officially launched on 23 April 2014.

Structure 
Elda Mata Miró-Sans is the current president, since April 3, 2022. Former presidents have been Rafael Arenas, Mariano Gomà, and Josep Ramon Bosch.  SCC board members have different ideological backgrounds and are or have been associated to pro-union parties such as People's Party of Catalonia, Citizens and Socialists' Party of Catalonia. SCC has delegations in Barcelonès, Baix Llobregat and Tarragona.

Creation 
SCC was legally constituted on April 7, 2014. SCC stated that its goal is to be a transverse platform against separatism. On April 23 of the same year SCC had its official presentation to the public at the Victoria Theater in Barcelona.  Susana Beltrán, who became a deputy of Citizens  in Catalonia's Parliament, was the host of the event and Bosch, Domingo and Coll delivered the keynote speeches. José Rosiñol was the moderator and also member of the provisional executive office. Other members from the provisional executive office who also attended the event were Isabel Porcel, Ana María Lindin and Ferran Brunet. The event was attended by members of mainstream political parties with representation in the Spanish parliament such as PP, Citizens, PSC and UPyD Some founding members were members of the Somatemps, including its first president Josep Ramon Bosch, Javier Barraycoa, Josep Alsina and Xavier Codorniu. SCC also received support from Jorge Moragas and Miram Tey.

Awards 

 In November 2014, eight months after its creation, SCC received from the European Parliament the European Citizen's Prize. The prize is awarded to "projects and initiatives that facilitate cross-border cooperation or promote mutual understanding within the EU."  SCC was nominated by the Catalan People's Party MEP Santiago Fisas.
 In January 2018 SCC received from socialist Ximo Puig, president of the government of Valencia (Generalitat Valenciana), the Manuel Broseta Foundation Award to Co-existence without the presence nor acceptance of Compromís and Podemos.

Activism 

 On 11 September 2014 (National Day of Catalonia) it organized its first big concentration event in Tarragona.
 On 12 October 2014 (Día de la Hispanidad), gathering 40,000 demonstrators in Barcelona against independence, according to the local police spokesman.
 On 8 October 2017, it mobilized hundreds of thousands of people (350,000 according to local police chief of press, more than 1 million according to the organization itself) in a demonstration at Barcelona. Former EU Parliament president and current Foreign Affairs Minister, socialist Josep Borrell, and Nobel Award Laureate Mario Vargas Llosa, delivered closing speeches at the demonstration.
 On 12 October 2017, a total of 65,000 people attended to a demonstration call made by SCC. 
 On 29 October 2017, 300,000 people according to local police (one million according to SCC) marched against the unilateral declaration of independence by the Catalan Regional Government. Manifesto speakers were Josep Borrell and Francisco Frutos, former leader of the Spanish Communist Party which condemned his participation in the demonstration and stated that he did not represent them in any way.
 On 5 December 2017, SCC denounces in Brussels an alleged indoctrination in schools of Catalonia in Catalan nationalism. Contrary to the beliefs of Spanish nationalism and related entities such as SCC, studies show that the national identity is influenced by parents and neighbours, not the education system.
 On 18 March 2018, 7,000 people were present in another demonstration. In this demonstration, former French Prime Minister Manuel Valls delivered the closing speech.

SCC demonstration calls have received cross-party support from Catalonia's Popular Party, PSC and Citizens and it is regarded by some as the leading anti-independence platforms in Catalonia along with the movement for Tabarnia.

SCC gave public support to a demonstration of the platform Tabarnia along with Vox and PxC.

In the first months of 2018 SCC started a round of meetings with Spanish politicians and political parties to discuss how to manage the Catalan independence movement in the context of the Spanish constitutional crisis. SCC established conversations with political party Cs (Citizens) and with the president of the government of Spain, Mariano Rajoy (president of People's Party). The organization also met with Susana Díaz, president of Andalusia and PSOE-A, and with Alberto Núñez Feijóo, president of Galicia and galician People's Party. Political parties En Marea and BNG were left out. In April, representatives of SCC met the leader of the Spanish socialist party PSOE Pedro Sanchez.

First proposed by Miriam Tey, Catalan Civil Society and Josep Ramon Bosch have formed a working group in order to negotiate with Manuel Valls his presentation to 2019 Spain's local elections as a Citizen's candidate.

Catalan Civil Society went to the European Parliament to claim that in Catalonia there is linguistic discrimination and that children rights are being violated. They also claimed the existence negative effects in children academic performance due to using Catalan as tuition language in the Catalan education system. This belief is aligned with the rhetoric used by Spanish nationalism. Republican Left of Catalonia MEP Josep Maria Terricabras recalled that PISA report does not show any difference, as is the case of the last PISA report, Spanish regional tests and university admission tests.

Criticism  

In January 2019, a court of law in Barcelona ruled that several pro-independence associations and politicians had to pay a 15,000 € fine for a manifesto published in 2015 which falsely accused SCC of having ties to Nazism and the extreme-right groups. The court also ruled that the defendants should stop making similar defamatory accusations in the future.

In 2015 Catalan separatist parties ERC and CiU, together with the Catalan Green party ICV, sent a joint letter to Sylvie Gillaume, then vice-president of the European Parliament, protesting the awarding of European Citizen's Price to Societat Civil Catalana. In the letter, they claimed that the SCC has links with Catalan far-right groups and promotes xenophobe and extremist ideas. However, SCC received the award in February 2015, triggering another protest letter. Gillaume dismissed this second letter, arguing that the award had already obtained approval at the Spanish and EU levels with the support from representatives from PP, PSOE, and UPyD. Members of the European Parliament from PSOE and PP were instrumental in the argument to  dismiss the accusations. Catalan Parliament, under the control of separatist groups, accepted a proposal from ICV to file a complaint to the European Parliament. PP, PSC and Citizens voted against the proposal, while ICV-EUiA, ERC, CUP and CiU supported the proposal.

Javier Barraycoa, former member of SCC and founder of Somatemps, has claimed that SCC received funding from the central government of Spain to support the pro-union demonstrations of the 8th and 12 October 2017. RENFE subsidized 50% of the cost of 245 train tickets for the Diada public act of SCC on September 11, 2014 in Tarragona. Josep Alsina has claimed that SCC receives grants from the Joan Boscà Foundation to which Catalan businesses has provided funding.

Publico, an online newspaper which supports Catalan self-determination, claims the balance sheet presented by SCC “lacks transparency” given that whilst SCC has only 75 members and 4,000 collaborators SCC, it managed to collect  one million euros in funding in 2014. The members only account for 1.5% of money contributions. Another 1.5% comes from gathering posts and urns. The rest, 97%, comes from private donations. However, audits have found no indication of wrongdoing. Félix Revuelta, founder and principal stakeholder of Naturhouse, stated that he and many other businessmen provided financial support to SCC.

Journalist in pro-independence media claim that a fringe pro-union organisation  Somatemps, to some SCC members have links, is a ‘far-right’ organisation as it opposes Catalan secession. They claim that Josep Ramon Bosch, Xavier Codorniu, José Domingo, Ferran Brunet and Joaquim Coll have attended or taken part in events from organisations they label as far-right: Somatemps, PxC, Vox, National Francisco Franco Foundation, National Democracy and Republican Social Movement. They indicate neo-nazi groups have attended mass demonstrations organized by the SCC, even though SCC condemns violence and has clarified it cannot control who attends in their demonstrations.

.

See also 

 Assemblea Nacional Catalana, an organization which seeks political independence of Catalonia from Spain.
 Òmnium Cultural, a Catalan Civil Association created to promote Catalan language and spread Catalan culture.
Jordi Borràs i Abelló, photojournalist who wrote Desmuntant Societat Civil Catalana and Plus Ultra.

References 

Organisations based in Catalonia
Recipients of the European Citizen's Prize